Fragments of an Unknown Teaching is a composition for piano by Canadian composer Peter Hatch.

It was inspired by the work of the Russian mystic philosophers G. I. Gurdjieff and P. D. Ouspensky.  Near the middle of the work, Hatch quotes part of one of Gurdjieff's harmonium improvisations very quietly over a sonorous octave tremolo G played in the low register.  While this line is usually played on the piano, in at least one performance (on September 17, 2005, in the Maureen Forrester Recital Hall in Waterloo, Ontario) the harmonium line was played by a harmonium offstage (the composer was present at this performance). The work was commissioned by Terence Kroetsch through the Ontario Arts Council, and was written in 1988.

Compositions for solo piano

ja:楽興の時 (ラフマニノフ)